The 2015–16 Penn Quakers men's basketball team represented the University of Pennsylvania during the 2015–16 NCAA Division I men's basketball season. The Quakers, led by first year head coach Steve Donahue, played their home games at The Palestra and were members of the Ivy League. They finished the season 11–17, 5–9 in Ivy League play to finish in fifth place.

Previous season 
The Quakers finished the season 9–19, 4–10 in Ivy League play to finish in a tie for seventh place.

Departures

Incoming Transfers

Recruiting

Recruiting class of 2016

Recruiting class of 2017

Roster

Schedule

|-
!colspan=9 style="background:#95001A; color:#01256E;"| Regular season

References

Penn Quakers men's basketball seasons
Penn
Penn Quakers
Penn Quakers